Michael Henry Marsham, 7th Earl of Romney (22 November 1910 – 5 June 2004) was a British Hereditary peer who served in the House of Lords.

Early life
Michael Henry Marsham was born on 22 November 1910 at Washpit Farm on the Rougham Hall Estate of the North family, at Rougham near King's Lynn in Norfolk, England. His father was Reginald Hastings Marsham (1865–1922), the second son of Charles Marsham, 4th Earl of Romney, who was thus his paternal grandfather, and his mother was Dora Hermione North (d.1923). He became an orphan at the age of twelve.

He was educated at Sherborne School, a private boarding school in Sherborne, Dorset in South-West England affiliated with the Church of England.

Career
He worked as the manager an estate owned by Shane O'Neill, 3rd Baron O'Neill and located in Randalstown, County Antrim, Northern Ireland. He collected rents from the Roman Catholic tenants who lived on the estate.

During World War II, he served as a Major in the Royal Artillery of the British Army and was stationed in County Londonderry.

He returned to his job as an estate manager shortly after the war in 1945, staying until 1963. It was then that it became apparent that he would inherit the Earldom, and he returned to Norfolk where the Earls of Romney have a country estate at Gayton Hall.

He inherited his titles (Baron Romney, Viscount Marsham and Earl of Romney) from his cousin, Charles Marsham, 6th Earl of Romney, in 1975, at the age of sixty. As a result, he served as a hereditary peer in the House of Lords from 1975 to 1999, when he lost his seat in the House as a result of the House of Lords Act 1999. Even though he served in the House for twenty-five years, he never made a single speech. He was interviewed in The Lord's Tale, a television documentary directed by Molly Dineen about hereditary peers. In the documentary, he joked that nobody cared about his views, but that the Conservative Party was happy to have his vote on their side.

A keen fox hunter, he served as the Hon. Secretary of the West Norfolk Foxhounds for many years. He also took part in the Countryside March organised by the Countryside Alliance in September 2002, when 400,000 people marched in central London to stand up for the interests of rural Britain.  He was the President of The Marine Society until his death.

Personal life
He married Aileen Landale in 1939. His wife died in 1995. They had no children.

Death
He died on 5 June 2004 at his home Wensum Farm, West Rudham, Norfolk. He was ninety-three years old. His title was inherited by a cousin, Julian Charles Marsham.

References

1910 births
2004 deaths
People from Breckland District
People educated at Sherborne School
Royal Artillery officers
Earls in the Peerage of the United Kingdom
Conservative Party (UK) hereditary peers
Fox hunters
Military personnel from Norfolk
British Army personnel of World War II
Romney